Chiramel is an Indian surname that may refer to
Davis Chiramel, Indian Syro-Malabar Catholic Church priest
Gabriel Chiramel (1914–2017), Indian Syro-Malabar Catholic priest, educationist, zoologist, author and social reformer
Thresia Chiramel Mankidiyan (1876–1926), Indian Syro-Malabar Christian